Molly, Mollie or mollies may refer to:

Animals
 Poecilia, a genus of fishes
 Poecilia sphenops, a fish species
 A female mule (horse–donkey hybrid)

People
 Molly (name) or Mollie, a female given name, including a list of persons and characters with the name
 Molly Pitcher, one of several American women believed to have helped fight against British forces during the American Revolution
 Molly Malone, a mythical 19th-century Irish fishmonger and associated folk song and statue
 Molly Mormon, a stereotype of a Latter-day Saints woman

Dance and theatre
 Molly (musical), a 1973 Broadway musical
 Molly dance, a form of English Morris dance

Film and television
 Molly (1983 film), an Australian film by Ned Lander
 Molly (1999 film), an American film starring Elisabeth Shue
 Molly: An American Girl on the Home Front, a 2006 made-for-television film
 The Roads Not Taken (working title Molly), a 2020 American drama film by Sally Potter
 Molly (miniseries), a 2016 Australian miniseries

Music
 "Molly" (Bobby Goldsboro song)
 "Molly" (Lil Pump song)
 "Molly" (Cedric Gervais song)
 "Molly" (Tyga song)
 "Molly (16 Candles Down the Drain)", a 1995 single by Sponge
 "Molly", a song by Mindless Self Indulgence from Tight
 "Molly", a song by Mike Oldfield from QE2
 "Molly", a song by Ween from the album The Pod
 The Mollys, an American band mixing Celtic folk and Tejano music

Places
 Aşağı Mollu, Azerbaijan, also called Molly
 Mollie, Indiana, an extinct American village
 Mollee, New South Wales, a parish in White County, New South Wales

In street slang
  MDMA's crystallized form, a party drug
sometimes Methylone
 Molotov cocktail, an improvised bottle-based incendiary weapon
 Molly house, a meeting place for gay men in 18th- and 19th-century England

Other uses
 Molly (fastener), a type of wall anchor
 Molly Maguires, a 19th-century Irish secret society
 MOLLE (military), Modular Lightweight Load-carrying Equipment

See also

 
 Moly
 Mali (disambiguation)
 Mahle (disambiguation)